Michel Sanchez (born 14 April 1967) is a French former professional footballer who played as a forward. He made two appearances for Perpignan in the 1994–95 Division 2.

Notes

References 

1967 births
Living people
People from Tarascon
Sportspeople from Bouches-du-Rhône
French footballers
Association football forwards
INF Vichy players
RC Lens players
Le Touquet AC players
Canet Roussillon FC players
Pau FC players
Valenciennes FC players
Montauban FCTG players
US Boulogne players
French Division 3 (1971–1993) players
Championnat National players
Ligue 2 players
Championnat National 2 players
Division d'Honneur players

French football managers
Association football player-managers
Canet Roussillon FC managers
Footballers from Provence-Alpes-Côte d'Azur